Toodyay Club was the name used for the gentlemen's club in Stirling House on Stirling Terrace in Toodyay, Western Australia that operated between 1908 and 1975.

The same club name was also used in 1905 for what was described as a social club.

Similar named organisations
However the name also applied to a range of other organisations, where the sport or hobby was often omitted in newspaper story headlines and abbreviated to Toodyay Club:

 Toodyay Amateur Swimming Club
 Toodyay Cricket Club
 Toodyay Cycle Club
 Toodyay Garden Club
 Toodyay Golf Club
 Toodyay Historical Society  1980 (as Toodyay Society), started in 1994.
 Toodyay Hockey Club – in reality the West Toodyay Hockey Team
 Toodyay Naturalists Club
 Toodyay Race Club
 Toodyay Rifle Club
 Toodyay Sports Club
 Toodyay Swimming Club
 Toodyay Veterans Cricket Club
 Toodyay Whippet Club
 Toodyay Young Men's Reading Club

Notes

Toodyay, Western Australia
Gentlemen's clubs in Australia